Nyctibatrachus anamallaiensis, the Anamallai night frog, is a species of frog in the family Nyctibatrachidae that is endemic to the southern Western Ghats, India. It is only known from the vicinity of its type locality, Valparai in Anaimalai Hills, Tamil Nadu. It was for a long time considered to be a synonym of Nyctibatrachus beddomii.

Nyctibatrachus anamallaiensis is a small species, reaching a snout–vent length of only . The type series is from a marshy pasture through which a small stream was running; the specimens were found in and near the water.

References

Nyctibatrachus
Frogs of India
Endemic fauna of the Western Ghats
Amphibians described in 1942